The word banlieue, which is French for "suburb," does not necessarily refer to an environment of social disenfranchisement.  Indeed, there exist many wealthy suburbs, such as  Neuilly-sur-Seine (the wealthiest commune of France) and Versailles outside Paris.  Nevertheless, the term banlieues has often been used to describe troubled suburban communities—those with high unemployment, high crime rates, and frequently, a high proportion of residents of foreign origin mainly from former French African colonies and therefore Berbers, Blacks, and Arabs.

Historical context

Rebuilding of France after World War II

The destruction of World War II, coupled with an increase in the country's population (due both to immigration and natural increase) left France with a severe housing shortage.  During the 1950s, shantytowns (bidonvilles) developed on the outskirts of major cities.  During the winter of 1954, popular priest Abbé Pierre urged the government to work on behalf of the country's large homeless population.  To relieve the shortage, and end the practice of illegal squatting in public places, the governments of the Fourth and early Fifth Republics began the construction of huge housing projects.  These included the villes nouvelles ("New towns") of Sarcelles, Cergy-Pontoise, Marne-la-Vallée and Sénart.  These were financed in part by the Marshall Plan, and organized through central planning, fixing industrial objectives to meet (Dirigisme).  The villes nouvelles owe much to Le Corbusier's architectural theories, which had been decried before the war.

During the Trente Glorieuses, a period of economic growth which lasted from the war's end until the 1973 oil crisis, and was accompanied by the baby boom, the French state and industrials encouraged immigration of young workers from the former colonies, mostly from the Maghreb (both Berbers and Arabs), to help fill labor shortages.

In 1962, upon the conclusion of the Algerian War 900,000 pieds-noirs (the European colons in Algeria, but also Maghrebi Jews) were repatriated to France, as well as most of the 91,000 Harkis (native Algerians who fought with the French army during the war).  The latter were put in internment camps, while the pieds-noirs settled mainly in the south of France. For example, the city of Montpellier experienced population growth of 94% between 1954 and 1975 (97,501 to 191,354). Harkis were not officially given permission to migrate, but some French military officers helped facilitate their migration to France in order to save them from certain reprisals in Algeria.  After being freed from the internment camps, many harkis went on to live alongside other Algerian and Maghrebi (both Berbers and Arabs) immigrants in shantytowns. In 1963, 43% of French Algerians lived in shantytowns. Azouz Begag, Delegate Minister for Equal Opportunities in the government of former Prime Minister Dominique de Villepin (UMP), has written an autobiographic novel, Le Gone du Chaâba, describing his experience living in a shantytown on the outskirts of Lyon.

Model of urban development

The vast new apartment blocks, or flats, were at first chiefly inhabited by members of the middle class. As the housing situation improved, most middle-class residents moved to better houses and immigrants left the shantytowns for the blocks. The blocks are termed "HLM" — habitation à loyer modéré ("moderated rent flats"), and districts of blocks are termed cités (housing estates). You can see some Parisian housing estates here: .  A popular urban planning concept at this time, popularized by Le Corbusier, a Swiss architect, was to separate areas of towns or cities according to several functions: living center (blocks), commercial center and working center, with the centers being connected by buses. This led to the isolation of the living centers, with two consequences:

 There was little activity at night and on Sunday, aggravated by the fact that bus transit to the central cities was limited;
 When unemployment started to rise in the late 1970s, the children did not see anybody working, as the working center was far away; in the 1990s, a lot of school-age children never saw their parents going to work, and never saw anyone working.

This model became increasingly contested; in the 1990s there were a number of demolitions of housing facilities in "inhumane" areas.

Some towns refused to build social buildings, leaving the poor further concentrated in certain towns which placed no or few restrictions on the construction of social housing.  An example is the city of Paris: when old buildings were destroyed, only office and high-rent apartment buildings were constructed in their place, preventing the poor from settling in those neighborhoods.  Most were forced to live in the northern suburbs (chiefly in the Seine-Saint-Denis and Val d'oise departments). In The Global City (2001), Saskia Sassen has analyzed the relationship between a new economic model and the shape of modern cities.  The public services offered (number of police officers, post offices, etc.) did not follow the tremendous increase of the population in these areas.  This phenomenon has been termed "ghettoisation."

The 13 December 2000 "SRU law" (loi de solidarité et renouvellement urbain, "solidarity and urban renewal act"), required that communes devote at least 20% of their housing capacity to social housing.  Many locally elected officials opposed the law, which sought to relieve residential segregation that had developed as a consequence of the earlier, uneven construction of the cités.  In the wealthy Parisian suburb of Neuilly-sur-Seine, of which President Nicolas Sarkozy served as mayor from 1983 to 2002, less than 2.5% of its housing stock meets the social-housing criteria.  After the 2005 riots, the government announced that it would enforce the SRU law more strictly, although it would accommodate local circumstances such as the absence of land on which social housing could be built.

Social context

Confrontation of cultures

The children of immigrants often feel torn between the culture of their parents and the culture they have grown up in. Many may feel themselves fully belonging to neither one.

A typical illustration of this is the use by some members of the French media of the words "second-generation from immigration" (deuxième génération issue de l'immigration, opposed to "just arrived", primo-arrivants). Children born in France are not immigrants, so the expression "second-generation immigrants" could be considered a misnomer. According to anti-racist associations such as SOS Racisme, this reflects the ambiguity of the administration, who consider these people to be both French and foreign at the same time. Children of immigrants also complain about the use of the term "integration" (intégration): the integration in the society (i.e. the acceptance of the laws and customs of the adoptive country) is a necessity for a foreigner; but for someone that has been born and raised in the country, it is improper to ask them to "integrate" into it.

Established policies of racial discrimination and of segregation

Perhaps the main reason for the alienation according to the younger generations in the poorest French suburbs is the racism, both casual and institutional. In this particular regard, France has long had a problem with dealing with both its present and its historical memory, especially with respect to its colonial past and its role during World War II—especially significant, for instance, is the lack of attention around the Paris massacre of 1961 and the still ongoing controversy surrounding the number of victims therein, an amount which as recently as ten years ago was still officially recognized as below 50 although most independent accounts place it by the hundreds. The February 23, 2005 law on colonialism, voted by the UMP conservative majority, stating that the positive consequences of colonization must be taught to students, created a wide uproar, including among many university teachers outraged by what they have called a mark of "historical revisionism", and an infringement on the legal principle of academic freedom.

Today, children of immigrants claim that they frequently encounter economic segregation or racism: they have problems getting a job, or finding an apartment, or even entering a nightclub, because of their names or skin color. The association SOS Racisme, which has close ties to the French Socialist Party, has claimed to have found experimental proof of such racism:
 When responding to job offers with identical CVs, except for name and address, to the same companies; CVs with African names received far fewer positive answers than CVs with typical French names;
 They filmed the entrance to selected nightclubs and observed discriminatory acts;
 They found widespread use of abbreviations such as "BBR," short for Bleu Blanc Rouge ("Blue White Red," the colors of the French flag), referring to ethnic Frenchmen and "NBBR" (Non Bleu Blanc Rouge - non-French) indicating the use of race in employers' databases;
 They found that discrimination is more widespread for those with college degrees than for those without;
 They found that French laws which make discrimination in employment illegal are rarely enforced, and that even when they are, punishment tends to be nominal.

The politically correct term for those discriminated against is "visible minority" (minorité visible), due to the fact that the segregation applies to any visible feature (color of skin, dress, name) and is not related to the ethnic group itself.

In some neighborhoods in the banlieue, unemployment exceeded 40% in 2005.  One explanation for this is that the general level of education in these areas is well below the national average, which, in a context where it is difficult to find jobs requiring little or no qualifications, is bound to generate high unemployment. According to the BBC, the unemployment rate for university graduates of French origin is 5%; this can be compared to the unemployment rate of 26.5% for university graduates of North African origin. According to the BBC, the inability of educated people who happen to be nonwhite to obtain employment and the connection to documented racism have left many feeling that they face dim prospects regardless of their actions.

French law restricts the access to most civil service jobs (fonction publique) for people who do not have  French nationality, though there are exceptions to this: some highly qualified positions (e.g. public research and higher education) are open regardless of citizenship, while some positions (e.g. defense and law enforcement) are open only to French citizens. Some sensitive positions (e.g. defense and the nuclear industry) may be difficult to obtain for people with close ties to "problem countries". Finally, not all public jobs fall into the civil service, and restrictions generally do not apply to non-civil service public positions.

Residents of the banlieues frequently complain that they are subject to racial profiling by the police ("face features offense", délit de faciès). "Identity Controls" — unannounced places where police demand identity papers from whomever they choose are extremely unpopular and seen as unbefitting a free society. Witnesses to these identity controls confirm that only nonwhites are commonly asked for their papers. The use of identity controls contributes to widespread distrust of police in the banlieues.

The perception that French police are effectively immune to the law, especially with regard to offenses committed against nonwhites, has also helped to fuel anger against them in the banlieue. The French newspaper Le Monde has written that "Justice is at a special tariff for police officers: they are never seriously punished." Cases such as one in which an eight-month suspended sentence was given to two police officers for manslaughter by asphyxiation against a black man have contributed to the belief that the police are unaccountable to the citizens who employ them. In April 2005, Amnesty International released a report that suggested that the French judicial system tacitly supports racially motivated violence by police.

In contrast, some in the right and especially the far-right, such as Jean-Marie Le Pen, claim that youth from the banlieues enjoy de facto immunity from prosecution and that most of them should be either sent back to the country of their origin or stripped of their French citizenship. They claim that the police and the prosecution are ordered by the government to be lenient, so as not to attract the wrath of left-wing and pro-immigration organisations.

A new report of Amnesty International investigates racially motivated executions, murders and abuses committed by the French police and the leniency expressed by the French government into investigating such cases has been published April 2, 2009. The report has mostly been censored by French news.

Economic context

Income

As in every country, some areas have a very high unemployment rate. As the social security, unemployment and other welfare system benefits are not indefinite, and are predicated upon having had a job at one point, families with no paid income do not benefit from the usually generous French social security system. In addition, the amount and duration are based on length of employment and the specific employment contract, further disadvantaging the unskilled immigrants in the banlieues. Welfare benefits include housing benefits and allocations familiales (welfare benefits for children). The sum that is paid to a non-working family is similar to that which one would receive working at a minimum wage part-time job. In France, there is a minimum salary called the SMIC: salaire minimum interprofessionnel de croissance. This is the minimal interprofessional wage which follows the economic growth of the country . It is illegal to hire someone for less than it. In 2005, the SMIC was 8.86 EUR per hour, 1,217.88 EUR per month for a full-time job.

Housing costs

If a family has fewer than three children, it will usually receive financial aid in the form of Aide Personnalisée au Logement (APL), personalised accommodation help), which is calculated according to the aggregate revenue of the household, and can account for as much as a third or even a half of the rent amount. If the family has three or more children it is not eligible for APL, but receives allocation familiales (family allowance), the amount of which depends on both the revenue of the household and the number of children, but it is not linear (the difference in the allocation between three and four children is higher than that between five and six, for example). The money is paid to the household, not individually. The housing projects are not rent-free, but are relatively inexpensive, and there tends to be an abundance of cheap rental accommodation in the zones sensibles (sensitive urban zone).

Health care costs

In France, the costs of seeing a doctor and obtaining medicine are at least partially refunded by the government, with the proportion varying between 30% and 100%. Low-income families receive CMU (Couverture maladie universelle - universal health allowance), a law voted in 1997 by Lionel Jospin's Plural Left government, meaning that not only 100% of the cost of medical expenses is paid for, but also that it is not necessary to pay up front for service. The CMU, however, only applies to very poor families. Those in higher income brackets must pay initially and then apply for reimbursement.

Education costs

Education is compulsory to age 16. After this age, school is optional and is carried out in the lycée (high school) in preparation for the baccalauréat, an academic degree. Entrance to both the college (middle school) and lycée are based upon a "sectorisation" system (called carte scolaire), which assigns students to schools geographically. However, one can attend a different public high school through other means, including following a special course of study (such as studying a less-commonly learned language, such as Portuguese). As in many countries, the quality of education offered by different public high schools varies. Some parents chose to send their children to private high schools for a small cost, most of them also receiving funding from government through a contract of association with the Minister of National Education (around 2.2 million students in 2007), other forms of private education (simple contract, outside contract and education at home) being really marginal.

Higher education is divided into three different categories: Universities, which are public; Grandes écoles which are public or private, and further study in a lycée towards a Brevet de Technicien Supérieur. Entrance to all is based upon the completion of the baccalauréat. Universities are the only ones which are allowed to deliver the title of Doctor, hence PhDs, medical doctors and dentists are all educated at universities. Also, universities are not free, with fees ranging from €100 to €600 and social security payments (€200) may be demanded for students who are older than 20. This may be a lot for some students, although those from poor families are exempt from paying fees and social security.

Entrance to the grandes écoles is earned through a national contest after the equivalent of two years of further study at a university. Costing between nothing and €6,000 annually, they enjoy a very good reputation amongst employers. On the other hand, public universities also give good education and graduates from universities have a reputation for being well-educated and well-trained, but there are significant differences between curricula, with some (such as medical schools) being highly selective and possessing a strong reputation, while some others are overcrowded and may not offer good job prospects. Given the large number of students that graduate annually, it can be challenging for a new graduates from a university to get a job without additional qualifications.

Student housing is generally inexpensive, ranging from €70 to €200 per month. However, students from poor backgrounds may have their rent paid for by the government, along with a monthly grant with which to buy food and books.

As in other countries, the quality of education received, and the peer group to which one belongs, can depend upon the school the child attends. In the zones sensibles, students may struggle to see the opportunities offered to them by the French education system. In addition, the teachers at these schools are frequently the least experienced, as those with more experience may avoid working in the 'zones sensibles' if possible. This can affect the quality of education that low-income students receive. To counter these effects, the French government established a system known as "ZEP" ("zones of priority education"), with incentives for teachers to work in the zones, as well as increased government funding. The ZEP system, though, was criticized by the right-wing government which took power in 2002; in 2005, Nicolas Sarkozy, as head of the UMP, the leading right-wing party, proposed a total reform of the system, which he deems insufficient.

The family background of low-income students can be critical to their success. In poorer areas, parents are often uneducated, and many women, in particular, are illiterate. In addition, families may be plagued by instability as caregivers may be obliged to work far away from home. To these concerns may be added motivational problems: some youth in the banlieues, perceiving French society to be biased against them, may see little point in obtaining a French education.

Welfare

Social policies implemented by the French government since 1981  include: minimal income for social insertion (revenu minimum d'insertion, RMI), universal health insurance (couverture maladie universelle) and housing allowances (subsidies for home councils in case of HLM, or direct help with the rent in the case of the personalised accommodation help, aide personnalisée au logement, APL), help for the children (Caisse d'allocations familiales). The results of this policies are still debated.

Right-wing parties have criticized this policy on several points:
 When all assistance is added up, total income from government sources is not far from the minimal legal income (Salaire minimum interprofessionnel de croissance, Smic); there is therefore limited incentive to seek paid employment. (Critics of this perspective have noted that it implies a shortage of willing workers, which has been demonstrated to be the case only in certain fields, such as construction and public works.)
 These policies are a way to buy social peace (Panem et circenses), but do not solve underlying social problems.
 Criminal behavior does not require social treatment but rather, stricter law enforcement.

Statistics

Poverty rates are higher than the national average in the cités; those for 2005  are shown below (national averages in parentheses):

 Unemployment: 20.7% (8.6%);
 Poverty: 26.5% (6%);
 Single-parent families: 15% (8%).

The cités contain a higher proportion of children and adolescents than in the rest of France: 31.5% of their population is 19 or younger, compared with 24.5% nationwide.

Urban violence and nonviolent demonstrations

The first suburban violence is believed to have occurred in 1979  in Vaulx-en-Velin in suburban Lyon. The first event to receive wide media coverage, however, was that in the Minguettes at Vénissieux, also near Lyon. After another violent episode in Vénissieux in March 1983, the Front National improved its standing in local elections, tapping into widespread fears that the violence would continue. Since then there have been both violent and nonviolent events in the cités, including:

 Events such as the "March for equality and against racism" (Marche pour l'égalité et contre le racisme) in 1983  and the women's movement Ni putes ni soumises ("Neither whores nor submissive"), formed in 2003  after the murder of Sohane Benziane, 17 years old, burnt alive by a young man.
 Riots, chiefly involving arson and stone throwing, usually provoked by the killing or wounding of a resident during a police operation. Riots in the banlieues have tended to last a few days. They have also tended to take place on New Year's Day.

Policymakers have used two different approaches to curb violence in the French suburbs. Some have advocated the management of poverty and social isolation by deploying social workers, forming school aid associations, and instituting crime prevention programs (the 'soft' approach). Others have taken a more hard-line stance, asserting that the best way to curb the violence is to increase the police presence in poor and violence-prone neighborhoods (the 'stick' approach).

Suburbs and the "quasi-apartheid"

Although there is no legal apartheid in France, in the sense there is no official will for separation of people,  the apartheid word has been used by many politics and journalists.

For instance, prime minister Manuel Valls considers that France faces an «apartheid territorial, social, ethnique » which could be translated in English words as an ethnic, social and territorial apartheid.

Algerian roots
During most of the period when Algeria was part of France (1830-1962),  Algerian Muslims were treated differently under law from French citizens, a situation which has been described as "quasi-apartheid". Although formally the Malékite Muslim right has not existed in metropolitan France, Algerian people coming in (metropolitan) France had to follow French law, this system has been understood to have continued in France, informally, after the repeal of the relevant laws and the independence of Algeria. According to Paul A. Silverstein, associate professor of anthropology at Reed College and author of Algeria in France: Transpolitics, Race, and Nation, and Chantal Tetreault, assistant professor of anthropology at University of North Carolina at Charlotte, who has researched and written extensively on language, gender, and social exclusion in French suburban housing projects, the colonial apartheid in Algeria has been re-created in the cities of France:

As such, the colonial dual cities described by North African urban theorists Janet Abu-Lughod, Zeynep Çelik, Paul Rabinow, and Gwendolyn Wright — in which native medinas were kept isolated from European settler neighborhoods out of competing concerns of historical preservation, public hygiene, and security — have been effectively re-created in the postcolonial present, with contemporary urban policy and policing maintaining suburban cités and their residents in a state of immobile apartheid, at a perpetual distance from urban, bourgeois centers.

Policy issues
Ralph Peters, in an article about the 2005 civil unrest in France, wrote that France's apartheid has a distinctly racial aspect. In his view, France's "5 million brown and black residents" have "failed to appreciate  discrimination, jobless rates of up to 50 percent, public humiliation, crime, bigotry and, of course, the glorious French culture that excluded them through an informal apartheid system." Left-wing French senator Roland Muzeau has blamed this apartheid on the right, insisting that it is responsible for both a "social" and "spatial" apartheid in cities controlled by the right, pointing out as an example that Nicolas Sarkozy, from 1983 to 2002 mayor of Neuilly-sur-Seine, refused to permit the construction of any public housing in the city.

French media also tend to ignore blacks and North Africans, failing to market to them, and not representing them in television, print, the internet, or advertisements. This in turn has led to protests against "l'apartheid culturel". against which is engaged the :fr:Club Averroes.

Following this constat, and under Jacques Chirac impulsion, some people have been changed to present TV programs. On TF1 channel one black or Arab person appeared. Other TV channels have also reconsidered some issues, such as TF1, France Télévision, Canal+, Arte France, M6 France 24 BFM La chaîne parlementaire et le Public Sénat.

Criticism
Some have argued that the claims of apartheid in France are a consequence of the rise of Islamic fundamentalism among some French Muslims, and not just government policy. This argument has been made in the debates about the 2005 French law on secularity and conspicuous religious symbols in schools, which was formulated primarily to prohibit girls from wearing the hijab in schools. It should however be noted that this argument originated in the far-right nationalist French party of Jean-Marie Le-Pen and was adopted by then French president Nicolas Sarkozy. Gilles Kepel, who co-authored this law, argued that it was not "acceptable" for members of different religions groups to primarily identify themselves as members of their faith (and secondarily as French) by wearing conspicuous religious symbols, as the end result would be "a sort of apartheid". Some French Muslim women also see the "apartheid" as being internally imposed by the French Muslim community, and the issue as not one about religious freedom, but rather "about saving schoolgirls from a kind of apartheid that was increasingly imposed by men in their community".

These debates also mirror earlier crises, particularly the "headscarf affair" of 1989, when three Muslim girls were excluded from schools for wearing headscarves. The affair triggered national debate in France, revealed previously unusual alliances between the left, feminists, and the right, and exposed differing views of and visions for the nature of French society. According to Maxim Silverman:

In the headscarf affair this 'vision', in its most extreme form, was often polarised in terms of the Republic or fundamentalism (secularism or fanaticism), the Republic or separate development (integration or apartheid). The problem for large parts of the Left was that they were often sharing the same discourse as Le Pen who used the affair to warn against 'the islamicisation of France'… in a splended example of the either/or choice facing France, in which there was is a convergence of many of the discursive elements mentioned above, the Prime Minister Michel Rocard announced on 2 December 1989, that France cannot be 'a juxtaposition of communities', must be founded on common values and must not follow the Anglo-Saxon model which allows ethnic groups to barricade themselves inside geographical and cultural ghettos leading to 'soft forms of apartheid' (quoted in Le Monde, 7 December 1989).

Minette Marrin of The Sunday Times, while recognizing that "poverty and rejection" have "played a significant part" in the problem, also believes that some French Muslims have "retreat[ed] into more extreme forms of Islam and into the arms of fundamentalists", and that Westerners have been unwilling to recognize this as "deliberate separatism — apartheid."

The French periodical Le Monde Diplomatique, however, disagrees with this assessment, and devoted two entire articles to the discussion of "urban apartheid" and "educational apartheid" in France, citing them as the two main factors in the explosive 2005 French youth riots.  Stating that the controversy of Islamic headscarves was a "smokescreen", it argues that "[a] few villains or a handful of Muslim "brothers"" cannot be held responsible for "the ghettoization of more than 700  (ZUS, "sensitive urban areas": government-designated problem areas) and their 5 million inhabitants." The authors agree with Laurent Bonelli that the violence was the result of "a process of urban apartheid" as well as "discrimination and racism that afflict young Berber, Arabs and Blacks".

Terminology
Montpellier's socialist mayor, Hélène Mandroux objects to the term "apartheid" in relation to France's treatment of African minorities, arguing that "Terms like urban apartheid are over-dramatic.  We recognize the problem and we are trying to deal with it, but this is not Johannesburg in the 1980s."

See also
 2005 civil unrest in France
 Islam in France
 Demographics of France
 Aire urbaine
 French hip hop
 Caisse d'allocations familiales
 Neither Whores Nor Submissives

Notes

References

French language reports from SOS Racisme
  (Analysis report about the job segregation followed by SOS racisme, PDF file, 39p), March 21, 2005
  (Activity report of SOS racisme against the discrimination in the access to private housing, PDF file, 37p), June 1, 2003
  (Racial and ethnic discriminations in the access to social housing)
 France Will Continue to Mirror Apartheid-Era South Africa, DiverseEducation.com, May 4, 2006.
 La droite organise un apartheid social, l'Humanité, June 5, 2007.
 Bell, David Scott. Presidential Power in Fifth Republic France, Berg Publishers, 2000. 
 Benguigui, Yamina Mémoires d'immigrés, l'héritage maghrébin ("Memory of immimgrants, the legacy of the Maghreb", documentary), 1997 
 Bonora-Waisman, Camille. France and the Algerian Conflict: Issues in Democracy and Political Stability, 1988–1995, Ashgate Publishing, 2003. 
 Felouzis, Georges and Perroton, Joëlle. The trouble with the schools, Le Monde diplomatique, December 2005.
 Follath, Erich. Tariq Ramadan on the crisis in France, Salon.com, November 16, 2005.
 Gentleman, Amelia. France wakes up to plight of its forgotten cities, The Guardian, August 6, 2004.
 Kelly, Debra. Autobiography And Independence: Selfhood and Creativity in North African Postcolonial Writing in French, Liverpool University Press, 2005. 
 Leiken, Robert S., Revolting in France; The labor-law protests pitted the privileged young against disaffected immigrants, The Weekly Standard,  5/1/2006.
 Maceda, Jim. France divided by headscarf debate, NBC News, February 9, 2004.
 Marrin, Minette. Muslim apartheid burns bright in France, The Sunday Times, November 13, 2005.
 McGoldrick, Dominic. Human Rights and Religion: The Islamic Headscarf Debate in Europe, Hart Publishing, 2006, 
 Mélanchon, Jean-Luc. Abolir l'apartheid social dans les banlieues, March 29, 2006.
 Peters, Ralph. France's Intifada, New York Post, November 8, 2005.
 Silverman, Maxim. Deconstructing the Nation: Immigration, Racism, and Citizenship in Modern France, Routledge, 1992. 
 Silverstein, Paul A. & Tetreault, Chantal. Postcolonial Urban Apartheid, Civil Unrest in the French Suburbs, November 2005, Social Science Research Council, June 11, 2006. Retrieved July 15, 2007.
 Simons, George F. EuroDiversity: A Business Guide to Managing Difference, Elsevier, 2002. 
 Smith, Craig S.Elite French Schools Block the Poor's Path to Power, New York Times, 18 December 2005
 Taheri, Amir. France’s Ticking Time Bomb, Arab News, November 5, 2005.
 Vidal, Dominique. The fight against urban apartheid, Le Monde diplomatique, December 2005.
 Wall, Irwin M. France, the United States, and the Algerian War, University of California Press, 2001.

External links
  Audio book (mp3) of the introduction and first chapter of Éric Maurin's book Le ghetto français, enquête sur le séparatisme social
  Listing of the 751 Zones Urbaines Sensibles including maps
 Vive la révolution … new rallying cry to France, The Age.

Arabs in France
Contemporary French history
Politics of France
Society of France
Islam in France
Berbers in France
Riots and civil disorder in France
Civil unrest
2007 riots
Urban decay in Europe
Racism in France
Discrimination in France
Social class in France